Ian "Rocky" Butler (born August 7, 1979 in Allentown, Pennsylvania) is a former quarterback who last played professionally in the Canadian Football League.

College career
He attended college at Hofstra University in Hempstead, New York on Long Island, where he started two seasons at quarterback. He finished second in 2001 for the Walter Payton Award, given to the top player in NCAA Division I-AA football.

CFL career
Rocky Butler was signed as a free agent by the Saskatchewan Roughriders on May 23, 2002.  He was the fourth-string quarterback that year. But after a bizarre rash of injuries to all three of Saskatchewan's roster quarterbacks, Butler earned his first CFL start in the 2002 Labour Day Classic against the powerful Winnipeg Blue Bombers.  Although he only completed 9 of 16 passes for 165 yards that day, he rushed for three touchdowns and helped the Riders score a convincing upset victory.  He failed to duplicate that success in his next two CFL appearances (both in Week 1 of the 2004 CFL season when starter Nealon Greene broke his leg and the Riders had to play two games in five days). However, in 2006, Kerry Joseph, the Riders starting quarterback, had been injured and was unable to start a game against the Hamilton Tiger-Cats, backup Marcus Crandell was injured early in the game, and Rocky Butler pulled off two more wins against the struggling Tiger-Cats 43-13 and 51-8 and threw for five touchdowns and ran for two more. On January 31, 2007 Rocky Butler was dealt in a multi-player trade to the Hamilton Tiger-Cats. On June 27, 2007 Rocky Butler was cut from the Hamilton Tiger-Cats. On July 16, 2007, Butler signed a practice roster agreement with the Toronto Argonauts.

Butler was released by the Argonauts in April, 2008, after the team signed Kerry Joseph in March.

Arena Football League
During the 2006 off-season, he signed with the New York Dragons of the Arena Football League. He was cut during training camp and spent the rest of the AFL season on the team's practice roster.

Personal
During the CFL offseason, he is a substitute teacher in New York. He generally goes by the nickname Rocky and in Saskatchewan was played the Rocky theme (Survivor's "Eye of the Tiger") whenever he entered the game at Quarterback. Fans of the Saskatchewan Roughriders have been known to chant his name in reference to the 1976 film Rocky on the occasions he has pulled off upset victories.

References

External links
Toronto Argonauts profile

Saskatchewan Roughriders players
Sportspeople from Allentown, Pennsylvania
1979 births
Hofstra Pride football players
Living people
Canadian football quarterbacks
American football quarterbacks
American players of Canadian football
Toronto Argonauts players
Players of American football from Pennsylvania